The 2022–23 season is Hyderabad cricket team's 89th competitive season. The Hyderabad cricket team is senior men's domestic cricket team based in the city of Hyderabad, India, run by the Hyderabad Cricket Association (HCA). They represent the state of Telangana in domestic competitions.

Squad

Departures
Hanuma Vihari returned to the Andhra after playing one season for the Hyderabad.

Players
The following players made at least one appearance for Hyderabad in first-class, List A or Twenty20 cricket in 2022–23 season.  Age given is at the start of Hyderabad's first match of the season (20 January 2023).
Players with international caps are listed in bold.

Competitions

Syed Mushtaq Ali Trophy

The Syed Mushtaq Ali Trophy, a Twenty20 cricket tournament in India, fixtures were announced by the Board of Control for Cricket in India (BCCI) on 8 August 2022 and the Hyderabad was placed in the Group B with all the group fixtures to be played in a bio-secure hub in Jaipur. On 6 October, the Hyderabad announced team for the tournament with Tanmay Agarwal as captain and Milap Mewada as coach.

Points table

Matches
Group stage

Vijay Hazare Trophy

The Vijay Hazare Trophy, a List A cricket tournament in India, fixtures were announced by the Board of Control for Cricket in India (BCCI) on 8 August 2022 and the Hyderabad was placed in the Group A with all the group fixtures to be played in New Delhi. On 6 November, the Hyderabad announced team for the tournament with Tanmay Agarwal as the captain.

Points table

Matches
Group stage

Ranji Trophy

The Vijay Hazare Trophy, a List A cricket tournament in India, fixtures were announced by the Board of Control for Cricket in India (BCCI) on 8 August 2022 and the Hyderabad was placed in the Group B with all the group fixtures to be played in New Delhi. On 10 December, the Hyderabad announced team for the tournament with Tanmay Agarwal as the captain.

Points table

Matches
Group stage

References

External links
Hyderabad cricket team official site

Cricket in Hyderabad, India
Cricket in Telangana
Sport in Telangana